A paper popper is a party prank that is commonly used in schools. There are many variations of a paper popper, but they all involve a folded sheet of paper being gripped and right down. This causes air to be forced into the paper's flaps, making the paper flaps pop out in the opposite direction, then making a loud popping noise. According to popular misconception, the sound is supposed to be caused by the paper breaking the sound barrier. In actuality, what happens is that air rushes in a blast wave to fill the vacuum created in the pocket that opens. The sound is described as the crack of a whip, which is an example of breaking the sound barrier, although the causes are different. Most papers work for poppers, although some are louder and some are quieter than others.

See also
 Action origami
 Paper plane
 OpenSCAD

External links
 Party Popper
 Triangle Popper

Popper, paper
Popper, paper
Toy instruments and noisemakers